Phymosia umbellata is a species of flowering plant in the family Malvaceae. It is native to Mexico and is cultivated as an ornamental plant.

In temperate areas it requires a warm, sheltered position.

References

Malveae
Flora of Mexico
Taxa named by Antonio José Cavanilles